Life's Highway is the fourth studio album by American country music artist Steve Wariner. It was released in 1985 by MCA. Three singles were released from it in 1986, and the first two singles, including the title track, went to number-one. This album peaked at #22. Rodney Crowell later recorded "She's Crazy for Leaving" on his 1989 album Diamonds & Dirt.

Track listing

Personnel

 Chet Atkins – Del Vecchio guitar solo (7)
 Eddie Bayers – drums (all tracks)
 Tony Brown – piano (9), synthesizer (1), truculent yell (4)
 Paul Davis – background vocals (5,10)
 Jerry Douglas – dobro (1)
 Emory Gordy Jr. - bass guitar (all tracks)
 John Hall – background vocals (8)
 Lance Hoppen – background vocals (8)
 Larry Hoppen - background vocals (8)
 Carl Jackson – background vocals (1)
 John Barlow Jarvis – keyboards (1,10), piano (3,4,5,6), electric piano (2,5,7,8,9)
 Shane Keister – organ (9), synthesizer (2,5), vocoder (7)
 Doana Kuper - truculent yell (4)
 Allyn Love – steel guitar (1,2,4)
 Mac McAnally - acoustic guitar (4,7), background vocals (1,7,10)
 Farrell Morris – percussion (2,5,7)
 Mark O'Connor – fiddle (6,10), mandolin (1)
 Keith Odle - truculent yell (4)
 Giles Reaves - truculent yell (4)
 John Wesley Ryles – background vocals (9)
 Gove Scrivenor - autoharp (10)
 Harry Stinson – background vocals (2,3)
 Wendy Waldman – background vocals (5)
 Billy Joe Walker Jr. – acoustic guitar (1,2,3,8,10), electric guitar (4,5,6,7,9)
 Steve Wariner – acoustic guitar (2), guitar solo (3,6), lead vocals (all tracks), background vocals (7)
 Terry Wariner – background vocals (4,6,10)
 Reggie Young – electric guitar (all tracks), wham bar (2)

Charts

Weekly charts

Year-end charts

References

Steve Wariner albums
1985 albums
Albums produced by Jimmy Bowen
Albums produced by Tony Brown (record producer)
MCA Records albums